Robert Toru Kiyosaki (born April 8, 1947) is an American entrepreneur, businessman and author. Kiyosaki is the founder of Rich Global LLC and the Rich Dad Company, a private financial education company that provides personal finance and business education to people through books and videos. The company's main revenues come from franchisees of the Rich Dad seminars that are conducted by independent individuals using Kiyosaki's brand name. He is also the creator of the Cashflow board and software games to educate adults and children about business and financial concepts.

Kiyosaki is the author of more than 26 books, including the international self-published personal finance Rich Dad Poor Dad series of books which has been translated into 51 languages and sold over 41 million copies worldwide. Kiyosaki is the subject of a class action suit filed by people who attended his seminars and has been the subject of two investigative documentaries by CBC Canada and WTAE USA. Kiyosaki's company, Rich Global LLC, filed for bankruptcy in 2012.

Early life and family 
Kiyosaki was born in 1947 in Hilo, in the American Territory of Hawaii, into a family of Japanese descent. He is the eldest child of four.

It is known that he attended Hilo High School, from which he graduated in 1965. Of the events that occurred in his adult life, little is known, although it has been Kiyosaki himself who has spoken about passages of his life in lectures that he has given and in the books that he has written.

In one of his talks, he claimed to have received congressional nominations from Senator Daniel K. Inouye for the United States Naval Academy and the U.S. Merchant Marine Academy.

As for his academic training, Kiyosaki attended the latter institution, located in New York, from where he graduated in 1969 with the degree of deck officer; subsequently, he was commissioned as a lieutenant in the Marine Corps.

After graduation from the U.S. Merchant Marine Academy, Kiyosaki got a job as a third officer with the Standard Oil company; However, despite the prestige that this meant, he decided to resign to join the Marine Corps.

Business career 
In 1974, Kiyosaki attended the Erhard EST seminars, which he says changed his life.

In 1977, he started a company called "Rippers". The company eventually went bankrupt.

Kiyosaki took a job as a sales associate for Xerox until June 1978.

In 1993, Kiyosaki published his first book, If You Want to Be Rich and Happy, Don't Go To School. In his book, he encouraged parents not to send their children to college and instead to enter the real estate business.

In 1997, Kiyosaki launched Cashflow Technologies, Inc., a business and financial education company that owns and operates the Rich Dad and Cashflow brands.

Other business ventures and investments 
Kiyosaki's earlier two businesses (for surfing bags with Velcro fasteners and T-shirts) went bankrupt. In an interview with CBC, Kiyosaki described his books as an advertisement for his higher-priced seminars. In 2012, Kiyosaki's company "Rich Global LLC" filed for bankruptcy and was ordered to pay nearly $24 million to the Learning Annex and its founder.

Business and financial advice 

Kiyosaki operates through a number of companies that he owns fully or in part, and through franchisee arrangements with other companies authorized to use his name for a fee. This includes Rich Dad LLC, Whitney Information Network, Rich Dad Education and Rich Dad Academy.

Kiyosaki's financial and business teachings focus on what he calls "financial education": generating passive income by focusing on business and investment opportunities, such as real estate investments, businesses, stocks and commodities, with the goal of being able to support oneself by such investments alone and thus achieving true financial independence.

Kiyosaki uses the term "assets" for things that put money in one's pocket. He stresses the importance of building up an asset first to fund one's liabilities instead of saving cash or relying on a salary from a traditional job.

Personal life 
Kiyosaki endorsed and supported Republican candidate Donald Trump for the 2016 presidential elections. Kiyosaki also co-authored two books with Trump.

Criticism 
In 2010, the Canadian Broadcasting Corporation did an exposé on scams that were being perpetuated by Kiyosaki's company in Canada in the guise of seminars. Upon tracking the success claims of "Rich Dad" seminar organizers, they discovered that these claims were not true. Investments in trailers and trailer parks, which were being propagated as "successful" by seminar teachers, were found to actually be barren pieces of land that no one was using.

Kiyosaki's advice has been criticized for emphasizing anecdotes and containing nothing in the way of concrete advice on how readers should proceed or work.

In 2006 and 2007, Kiyosaki's Rich Dad seminars continued to promote real estate as a sound investment, just before their prices came crashing down.

In 2010, Allan Roth of CBS News documented what occurred when he attended one of Rich Dad's free seminars and dissected some of the tactics employed. The Marketplace exposé on his seminars in Canada showed what occurred in $450 seminars through a hidden camera including Kiyosaki's response to them.

Books authored 

 Rich Dad Poor Dad – What the Rich Teach Their Kids About Money – That the Poor and Middle Class Do Not! (first published in 1997) Warner Business Books. .
 Cashflow Quadrant: Rich Dad's Guide to Financial Freedom (2000). .
 Rich Dad's Guide to Investing: What the Rich Invest in, That the Poor and the Middle Class Do Not! (2000). .
 The Business School for People Who Like Helping People (March 2001).  – endorses multi-level marketing
 Rich Dad's Rich Kid, Smart Kid: Giving Your Children a Financial Headstart (2001). .
 Rich Dad's Retire Young, Retire Rich (2002). .
 Rich Dad's Prophecy: Why the Biggest Stock Market Crash in History Is Still Coming… and How You Can Prepare Yourself and Profit from It! (2002). Warner Books. .
 Rich Dad's The Business School: For People Who Like Helping People (2003) .
 Rich Dad's Who Took My Money?: Why Slow Investors Lose and Fast Money Wins! (2004) .
 Rich Dad, Poor Dad for Teens: The Secrets About Money – That You Don't Learn in School! (2004) .
 Rich Dad's Before You Quit Your Job: 10 Real-Life Lessons Every Entrepreneur Should Know About Building a Multimillion-Dollar Business (2005). .
 Why We Want You to Be Rich: Two Men, One Message (2006) co-written with Donald Trump .
 Rich Dad's Increase Your Financial IQ: Get Smarter with Your Money (2008). .
 Rich Dad's Conspiracy of the Rich: The 8 New Rules of Money (2009). 
 The Real Book of Real Estate: Real Experts. Real Stories. Real Life. (2009) .
 An Unfair Advantage: The Power of Financial Education (2011). .
 Midas Touch: Why Some Entrepreneurs Get Rich And Why Most Don't (2011), co-written with Donald Trump .
 Why 'A' Students Work for 'C' Students and Why 'B' Students Work for the Government: Rich Dad's Guide to Financial Education for Parents (2013). .
 The Business of the 21st Century (2010), co-written with John Fleming and Kim Kiyosaki .
 Second Chance: for Your Money, Your Life and Our World (2015) 
 8 Lessons in Military Leadership for Entrepreneurs: How Military Values and Experience Can Shape Business and Life (2015) 
 Why the Rich are Getting Richer: What is Financial Education...Really? (2017) 
 FAKE: Fake Money, Fake Teachers, Fake Assets: How Lies Are Making the Poor and Middle Class Poorer (2019) 
 Who Stole My Pension?: How You Can Stop The Looting (2020) 
 Capitalist Manifesto: Money for Nothing - Gold, Silver, and Bitcoin For Free. (2022) 
 Ravens: How To Prepare For And Profit From The Turbulent Times Ahead. (2023)

References

External links 
 
 
 
 

1947 births
Living people
20th-century American businesspeople
20th-century American non-fiction writers
21st-century American businesspeople
21st-century American non-fiction writers
American bloggers
American book publishers (people)
American people of Japanese descent
American business writers
American chief executives of education-related organizations
American finance and investment writers
American financial commentators
American financiers
American investors
American mass media company founders
American motivational speakers
American motivational writers
American online publication editors
American retail chief executives
American self-help writers
American venture capitalists
Businesspeople from Arizona
Businesspeople from Hawaii
People from Hilo, Hawaii
Personal finance education
Recipients of the Air Medal
United States Marine Corps officers
United States Merchant Marine Academy alumni
United States Naval Aviators
University of Hawaiʻi at Hilo alumni
Video game producers
Writers from Hawaii
Writers from Phoenix, Arizona
Writers from Scottsdale, Arizona
American aviators of Asian descent